Smile is an EP by Swedish band the Wannadies. Their debut release, the EP lead to the band being signed by MNW Records in Sweden.

Track listing
"The Beast Cures the Lover"
"This Time"
"I Want More"

External links

1989 debut EPs
The Wannadies albums